Bingöl Province is a province of Turkey. The province was known as Çapakçur Province before 1945 when it was renamed as Bingöl Province. The province had a population of 283,112 in 2021 and encompasses 11 municipalities, 325 villages and 693 hamlets.

The town of Genç was the scene of origin for the Kurdish Sheikh Said rebellion in 1925 and most of the region was captured by the rebels during the rebellion.

As the current Governor of the province, Kadir Ekinci was appointed by the president on the 5 November 2018.

Demographics 

Kurds comprise the majority of the province and the province is considered part of Turkish Kurdistan. Its population is majority Sunni, conservative and many adhere to the Naqshbandi order. The province moreover has a significant Alevi minority. Linguistically, the southern parts of the province speak Zaza, while the northern parts speak Kurmanji. Many Zaza-speakers speak Kurmanji as well.

Language and religion statistics 
Bingöl Province was part of Bitlis Vilayet during the Ottoman era as Genç Sanjak and had a population of 36,011 in the 1881-1882 census.  of the population was Muslim and the remaining  was Armenian. All of the Armenians adhered to the Armenian Apostolic Church. 

The first Turkish census which included Bingöl Province was the 1945 census, where the population was 75,550 who all were Muslims.

A 2016 survey showed that 90.4% of the population spoke Turkish, 64.1% spoke Zaza, 40.1% spoke Kurmanji and 5.6% spoke Arabic.

History 
From 1923 to 1929, Bingöl Province was part of Elazığ Province and part of Muş Province from 1929 to 1936. It ultimately became a province in 1936.

In December 1935 the Tunceli Law was passed which demanded a more powerful government in the region. Therefore the region containing the present Bingöl province, together with the provinces of Tunceli, Erzincan and Elaziğ were included in the Fourth Inspectorate General (Umumi Müfettişlik, UM) in January 1936. The fourth UM was governed by a Governor Commander. All the employees in the municipalities were to be from the military and the Governor Commander had the authority to evacuate whole villages and resettle them in other parts of the province. in 1946 the Tunceli Law was abolished and the state of emergency removed but the authority of the fourth UM was transferred to the military. The Inspectorate General was dissolved in 1952 during the Government of the Democrat Party.

Districts
Bingöl province is divided into 8 districts (capital district in bold):
 Adaklı
 Bingöl
 Genç
 Karlıova
 Kiğı
 Solhan
 Yayladere
 Yedisu

Bibliography

Gallery

References

 
States and territories established in 1936
Turkish Kurdistan